Daan Buijze (born 22 October 1928) is a Dutch former swimmer. He competed in the men's 200 metre breaststroke at the 1952 Summer Olympics.

References

External links
 

1928 births
Living people
Olympic swimmers of the Netherlands
Swimmers at the 1952 Summer Olympics
Sportspeople from Delft
Dutch male breaststroke swimmers
20th-century Dutch people